Strategic Organization is a quarterly peer-reviewed academic journal that covers the fields of strategic management and organization studies. Its editors-in-chief are Oliver Alexy (Technical University of Munich), Luca Berchicci (Rotterdam School of Management), Charlotte Cloutier (HEC Montréal), Glen W.S. Dowell (Cornell University), Paula Jarzabkowski (Bayes Business School & University of Queensland), Caterina Moschieri (IE Business School), Amit Nigam (Bayes Business School), and Margarethe Wiersema (University of California Irvine). It was established in 2003 and is published by SAGE Publications.

Abstracting and indexing
The journal is abstracted and indexed in Scopus and the Social Sciences Citation Index. According to the Journal Citation Reports, its 2013 impact factor is 1.853, ranking it 36th out of 110 journals in the category "Business" and 49th out of 172 journals in the category "Management".

References

External links
 

SAGE Publishing academic journals
English-language journals
Quarterly journals
Business and management journals
Publications established in 2003